Coraliomargarita akajimensis is a Gram-negative, obligately aerobic, non-spore-forming and non-motile bacterium from the genus of Coraliomargarita which has been isolated from seawater from Japan.

References

Verrucomicrobiota
Bacteria described in 2007